The Internet in Greece relied on PSTN/ISDN modem dial-up from 1990 until 2003, when ADSL was commercially launched by the incumbent operator OTE. ADSL2+, VDSL2 and GPON are currently the main broadband standards in Greece.It has 3G, 4G, 4G+ and 5G mobile broadband (HSPA) and a more expensive Satellite Internet access.It also has an extensive fiber-optic network throughout the country.

Statistics
 Top-level domain: .gr
 Internet users: 6.0 million users, 52nd in the world; 56.0% of the population, 71st in the world (2012).
 Fixed broadband: 2.5 million subscriptions, 32nd in the world; 23.5% of the population, 40th in the world (2012).
 Wireless broadband: 4.8 million, 38th in the world; 44.5% of the population, 35th in the world (2012).
 Internet hosts: 3.2 million hosts, 32nd in the world (2012).
 IPv4: 5,549,568 addresses allocated, 0.1% of the world total, 515 addresses per 1,000 people (2012).
 Internet service providers (ISPs): Approximately 23 ISPs. Two Tier 1 ISPs.

It is expected that Greece by October 2020 will be connected to Cyprus, Israel, Italy, France and Spain with Quantum Cable, 7,700km ultra high speed fiber-optic submarine communications cable. It is expected to have 160 Tbit/s (terabits per second), capacity enough to handle up to 60% of the world’s internet traffic at peak time (2018).  The Quantum Cable will be laid at the same time as the 2,000 MW EuroAsia Interconnector. It will upgrade Greece to telecom hub.

FTTH
FTTH (fiber-to-the-home) is a form of fiber-optic communication delivery that reaches a living or working space. The fiber extends from the central office to the subscriber's living or working space.

Some of the major FTTH providers in Greece are:
Inalan
HCN
Vodafone Greece
Cosmote 
WIND Hellas

DSL
A variety of new entrants have appeared since the liberalization of the market and local-loop unbundling. These operators typically offer lower prices than OTE (Cosmote).

Some of the major DSL providers are:
Cosmote
Nova (after merger with Forthnet)
Vodafone Greece (after merger with Hellas Online and Cyta Hellas)
WIND Hellas

Defunct Providers:
On Telecoms
Vivodi Telecom

Internet speed in Greece today

The available speeds are:
up to 24 MB/s ADSL2+
up to 200 MB/s VDSL2 (with Super Vectoring)
up to 120 MB/s FTTB
up to 250 MB/s AWMN (Athens Wireless Metropolitan Network)
up to 10 GB/s FTTO/FTTH

Mobile broadband access

Mobile broadband offers are available from all three national mobile phone operators Cosmote, Vodafone Greece and WIND Hellas, with more than 1GB/s downlink speeds. Mobile broadband was heavily marketed during 2008 by all three, leading to a surge in mobile Internet usage, primarily with mobile professionals and young users.

The access technologies used by all three providers are primarily LTE (and LTE+) as well as 5G with 90th percentile figures for Cosmote reaching over 240MB/s and for Vodafone Greece and WIND Hellas over 110MB/s.

Satellite broadband

Greece is covered by various satellite broadband services:

 Hellas-Sat offers satellite service under the "Hellas Sat Net" brandname. OTE, as one of the owners of Hellas Sat, offers Hellas Sat Net service through its distribution channels (website, shops etc.). The company operates its services with user-paid subscriptions. The equipment is installed by Hellas Sat accredited engineers and it includes a Satnet S3020 DVB - RCS VSAT Terminal (Advantech) satellite modem and a 0,96m Antenna (satellite dish with transmitter receiver). Hellas Sat Net connections are also used to interconnect public administration offices and schools in remote areas (mostly remote islands of the Aegean Sea) to the national administration network Syzefxis and to the Internet).
 Tooway covers Greece with broadband satellite Internet.Operations started at 2011. they offer a downstream speed of up to 22 MB/s and an upstream speed of up to 6 MB/s. Tooway also offers subscription-based broadband services for various customers.
 BigBlu is a UK-based company that begun offering satellite internet connection since August 2019 to the Greek market. Unlimited packages with speed of up to 50 MB/s and an upstream speed of up to 6 MB/s. It specializes in  addressing people in areas without a basic telephone connection.

Internet censorship and surveillance

Greece practices some internet censorship, including the blocking of websites that offer unauthorized online gambling.

The constitution provides for freedom of speech and press, and the government generally respects these rights in practice. Independent media are active and express a wide variety of views. Individuals can criticize the government publicly or privately without reprisal, and the government does not impede criticism. However, the law provides for prosecution of individuals who "intentionally incite others to actions that could provoke discrimination, hatred, or violence against persons or groups of persons on the basis of their race or ethnic origin or who express ideas insulting to persons or to groups of persons because of their race or ethnic origin." In practice the government has never invoked these provisions. The law permits any prosecutor to order the seizure of publications that insult the president, offend any religion, contain obscenity, advocate for the violent overthrow of the political system, or disclose military secrets. The law provides criminal penalties for defamation, however, in most criminal defamation cases, authorities released defendants on bail pending trial and they served no time in jail. The constitution and law prohibit arbitrary interference with privacy, family, home, or correspondence. However, NGOs such as the Greek Helsinki Monitor report that authorities do not always respect these provisions in practice.

On October 28, 2012 police arrested a Greek journalist, Kostas Vaxevanis, for violating personal privacy laws for publishing the "Lagarde List" of more than 2,000 alleged Greek tax evaders with Swiss bank accounts. On November 1, a court acquitted him; prosecutors appealed the verdict, and a re-trial date was pending at the end of 2012. In the 2013 re-trial, he was acquitted again.

In September 2012 the cyber-crime police arrested a 27-year-old man, F. Loizos, charging him with "malicious blasphemy and insulting religion". The man reportedly created a Facebook page under the name "Elder Pastitsios" that played on the name of a legendary Mount Athos monk famous for his prophecies about Greece and Orthodox Christianity, and the name of a popular Greek dish. The cyber-crime police seized the man’s laptop and removed the Facebook page. On January 16, 2014, he was found guilty of "repeatedly insulting religion" and was sentenced to ten months in jail, suspended while the prosecutor had recommended a smaller sentence. In the 2017 re-trial, however, the court acquitted Loizos.

On August 6, 2009, the most-visited Greek blog (troktiko.blogspot.com) was shut down. Although Google cites potential violations of the terms of use, comments implying other reasons behind the closure of the Troktiko blog were published in several leading Greek blogs. The blog went back on-line a few months later and suspended its activities in July 2010, after the assassination of Sokratis Giolias, its administrator.

On June 29, 2009, Georgios Sanidas, the soon-to-be-retired Prosecutor of the Greek Supreme Court (Areios Pagos), declared that "Internet-based communications are not covered by current privacy laws" and are thus open to surveillance by the police. Such surveillance would be, according to Sanidas's mandate, completely legal. Following this proclamation, Greek bloggers, legal experts and notable personalities from the media have claimed that Sanidas's mandate contravenes both the Greek constitution and current EU laws regarding the privacy of Internet communications. Furthermore, this mandate has been greatly criticised as being a first step towards full censorship of all Internet content.

See also

 Greek Internet Exchange (GR-IX), an independent, non-profit Internet exchange point located in Athens.
 Greek Research and Technology Network (GRNET), the national research and education network of Greece.
 Hellenic Telecommunications Organization S.A., known by its Greek initials OTE, is the dominant telecommunications provider in Greece.

References

External links
 Greece on the Internet, IPduh.
 www.adslgr.com, an independent review site for broadband in Greece .
 .GR Registry, domain name registry, Foundation for Research & Technology - Hellas (FORTH).
 .GR.COM, alternative domain name registry, CentralNIC.
 GR-IX, Greek Internet Exchange .
 ΕΔΕΤ , GRNET , research and education network of Greece.